Mikael Bertelsen (born Mikael Simson Bertelsen on 5 October 1967) is a Danish radio and TV personality. He was a channel executive at public service station Radio24syv with Mads Brügger. He hosted shows such as Bertelsen - DR2´s Talkshow, 1999, De uaktuelle nyheder, 2002, den 11. time, 2007, Bertelsen på Caminoen and Læsegruppen Sundholm.

Personal life
Bertelsen is married to Malou Aamund. The couple has three children.

References

21st-century Danish journalists
Danish radio presenters
Danish television presenters
Radio24syv people
Living people
1967 births